Baudeh-ye Sofla (also Romanized as Bā’ūdeh-ye Soflá; also known as Bā’ūdeh) is a village in Ahlamerestaq-e Jonubi Rural District, in the Central District of Mahmudabad County, Mazandaran Province, Iran. At the 2006 census, its population was 517, in 137 families.

References 

Populated places in Mahmudabad County